John Leehane (20 October 1921 – 22 July 1991) was an Australian cricketer. He played one first-class cricket match for Victoria in 1950.

See also
 List of Victoria first-class cricketers

References

External links
 

1921 births
1991 deaths
Australian cricketers
Victoria cricketers
Cricketers from Melbourne